Neil Squire Society is a Canadian national not-for-profit organization that helps Canadians with disabilities through advocacy, computer-based assistive technology, research and development, and various employment programs. It has four locations across Canada.

History 

The Neil Squire Society began as a result of Bill Cameron's efforts with his relative Neil Squire. When Neil was paralyzed from the neck down in a car accident in 1980, Bill created a “sip-and-puff” machine to allow Neil to communicate using Morse code. Soon thereafter, Bill and a small group of volunteers began teaching other rehabilitation patients to use computers to enhance their independence. This marked the creation of the Neil Squire Society's first program, Computer Comfort.

After Neil's death in 1984, the group decided to name its new organization in his honour. The group was originally incorporated as the Neil Squire Rehabilitation Society, then the Neil Squire Foundation. The group went through one more name change and is now the Neil Squire Society.

Headquartered in Burnaby, British Columbia, Canada, the Neil Squire Society also has offices in Fredericton, Ottawa, and Regina.

Programs and services

Programs 

The Neil Squire Society provides employment programs, computer tutoring, online services and assistive technology for persons with disabilities.

Services 

A for-profit social enterprise, it provides workplace ergonomic and assistive technology for individuals and employers. Clients of this program begin with an assessment in one of the Neil Squire Society's Assistive Technology for Employment Centre (ATEC) labs where they are matched with and trained on the assistive technology that best suits their needs.

Research and development 

One of the major focuses of the Neil Squire Society is the development of technologies that enable persons with disabilities to be fully involved with society. The Research and Development arm of the Society facilitates the development of these technologies.

The Research and Development Group has been responsible for many advancements in the field of accessibility.

References

Further reading
 
 

Organizations based in British Columbia
Burnaby
1984 establishments in British Columbia